Kunigal Nagabhushan (6 December 1945 – 23 June 2013) was an Indian actor in the Kannada film industry. His films include S.P. Sangliyana 2 (1990), C.B.I. Shankar (1989), Daari Tappida Maga (1975).

Career 
Kunigal Nagabhushan had contributed to more than two hundred Kannada films, as actor, dialogue writer and assistant director.

Selected filmography
Writer
Swalpa Adjust Madkolli (2000)
Gadibidi Krishna (1998)
 Nagaradalli Nayakaru (1992)
 Solillada Saradara (1992)
 Gauri Ganesha (1991)
 Golmaal Radhakrishna 2 (1991)
 Ganeshana Maduve (1990)
 Golmaal Radhakrishna (1990)
Actor
Gokula Krishna (2012)
Kiladi Krishna (2010)
Ramasamy Krishnasamy (2003)
Mane Magalu (2003)
Ammavra Ganda (1997)
Amruthavarshini (1997)
Yaarigoo Helbedi(1992)

Awards

See also

List of people from Karnataka
Cinema of Karnataka
List of Indian film actors
Cinema of India

References

External links

Male actors in Kannada cinema
Indian male film actors
Male actors from Karnataka
20th-century Indian male actors
21st-century Indian male actors
1945 births
2013 deaths